The Ottawa Hotel  in Montreal, Quebec, Canada, was built in 1845 at 50 Saint Jacques Street by George Hall. It is a 19th-century example of an attempt to build a skyscraper. Hall had previously owned a hotel by the same name located at the corner of McGill and St. Maurice Streets from at least 1842.

The Lovell's City Directories of 1844/45 through to 1850 lists the two Ottawa Hotels as: Ottawa Hotel (old,) (F.P. Levine,) McGill Street and Ottawa Hotel (new,) (George Hall,) 50 Great St. James Street.

The 1850 Lovell's listing also has an advertisement which states:

The Lovell's Directories after 1852 list only the one Ottawa Hotel, on Great St. James Street. (Great St. James Street ran from Place d'Armes west to McGill Street, while Little St. James Street ran east from Place d'Armes to St. Gabriel Street)  The 1852 Lovell's listing also has a full-page advertisement which states:

Different ads run in the Lovell's Directories between 1855/56 and 1857/58 also add that:

The Ottawa Hotel continued in operation until about 1881/82, after which it was converted into stores and offices. For example, the Euard & MacDonald Hardware occupied space in the Ottawa Hotel from 1882/83.

The neo-classical hotel is still home to offices and stores today.

See also
Old Montreal

References

Rémillard, François, Old Montreal - A Walking Tour, Ministère des Affaires culturelles du Québec, 1992

External links

Photograph:Ottawa Hotel, 1874 - McCord Museum

Defunct hotels in Canada
History of Montreal
Hotel buildings completed in 1845
Hotels established in 1845
Hotels in Montreal
Neoclassical architecture in Canada
Old Montreal